Mohamed Majeri (born 23 August 1948) is a Tunisian boxer. He competed in the men's light middleweight event at the 1972 Summer Olympics.

References

1948 births
Living people
Tunisian male boxers
Olympic boxers of Tunisia
Boxers at the 1972 Summer Olympics
Place of birth missing (living people)
Mediterranean Games silver medalists for Tunisia
Mediterranean Games medalists in boxing
Competitors at the 1971 Mediterranean Games
Light-middleweight boxers
20th-century Tunisian people